The Najran Valley Dam is an arch dam on Wadi Najran about  southwest of Najran, in the Najran Province of southwest Saudi Arabia. It has several purpose to include water supply, flood control and groundwater recharge. Its collects run-off and sediment in the wadi and helps release it downstream slowly throughout the year. The dam was completed in 1981, and inaugurated by the Crown Prince of Saudi Arabia Nayef bin Abdulaziz Al Saud in 1982. It is owned by the Ministry of Water and Electricity.

See also 

 List of dams in Saudi Arabia

References

External links 
 Najran Valley Dam.wmv (YouTube)
 Najran dam

Dams in Saudi Arabia
Arch dams
Dams completed in 1981
Najran